Word of Mouth is the ninth studio album by American country music singer Mac McAnally. It was released by DreamWorks Nashville in 1999.

Content
Restless Heart covered "Looking Back" on their 2004 album Still Restless, which McAnally co-produced.

Critical reception

Heather Phares of AllMusic says, "Mac McAnally's Word of Mouth features the singer/songwriter/producer/arranger's multiple talents in effect." Geoffrey Himes of The Washington Post writes, "Mac McAnally makes such a good living in Nashville writing songs and playing sessions for the likes of Jimmy Buffett, Sawyer Brown, Steve Wariner and Randy Travis that he doesn't have to rely on his own albums to support himself. So when he gets around to releasing the occasional album (this is his first in five years), he needn't worry about trying to please country radio. Instead he indulges his yen for left-field genre exercises and more personal songs, as on his latest release, Word of Mouth." Jon Weisberge of Country Standard Time states that "it's easy to see why McAnally has enjoyed only intermittent success as a solo artist: he doesn't fit easily into any category. If you like well-crafted, polished songs in a variety of styles, though, this fits the bill."

Track listing

Personnel
Adapted from Word of Mouth liner notes.

Musicians
 Richard Bennett - electric guitar (1, 3, 4, 6, 9), acoustic guitar (2, 7, 8)
 Duncan Cameron - electric guitar (2, 3)
 Chad Cromwell - drums (1-4, 6, 7, 9)
 Stuart Duncan - fiddle (1, 2, 4, 6-9), mandolin (3)
 Roger Guth - drums (5, 10)
 John Lovell - muted trumpet (5)
 Jim Mayer - bass guitar (5, 10)
 Mac McAnally - acoustic guitar (1-4, 6, 7, 9), acoustic fingerstyle guitar (9), slide guitar (1), piano (1, 2, 5, 6, 8, 10), percussion (1), vibraphone (5), electric guitar (4, 6, 7, 8), electric piano (6, 10), 12-string guitar (10), gut string guitar (10)
 Steve Nathan - keyboards (1, 2, 4, 6-9), Wurlitzer electric piano (3), organ (4)
 Peter Mayer - electric guitar (5, 10)
 Tom Roady - percussion (1-4, 6-9)
 Steuart Smith - electric guitar (1-4, 6-9)
 James Stroud - drums (8)
 Greg "Fingers" Taylor - harmonica (3)
 Glenn Worf - bass guitar (1-4, 6-9)

Vocals
Coral Reefer Band (Peter Mayer, Jim Mayer, Tina Gullickson, Nadirah Shakoor, Michael Utley) - 4
 Derek George - 9
 Mac McAnally - 1, 3, 4, 6, 7, 9
 Kim Richey - 6, 7
 Harry Stinson - 2, 4, 6, 7
 Bryan White - 9

Technical
 Eric Conn - digital editing
 Tyler Gish - assistant
 Steve Lowery - assistant
 Mac McAnally - producer
 Denny Purcell - mastering
 Alan Schulman - recording, mixing
 Chris Stone - assistant

References

1999 albums
DreamWorks Records albums
Mac McAnally albums
Albums produced by Mac McAnally